Bellmer Dolls is a New York-based post-punk band.

Biography
Named after the life-sized mannequins of German Surrealist Hans Bellmer, the group was founded in 2003 by Peter Mavrogeorgis after finishing a 3-year stint as guitarist for Tav Falco's Panther Burns. The band's earliest incarnation featured fellow Tav Falco-alumnus Douglas Hodges, and bassist Benjamin Cerf. The lineup changed just months after the band's inception, with Cerf being replaced by Anthony Malat, formerly of the bands Love Life, Universal Order of Armageddon, and The Great Unraveling. Hodges was soon after replaced by percussionist Daniel Sheerin.

Mavrogeorgis's past collaborations include Dame Darcy (Peter is accredited as producer and collaborator on "Dame Darcy's Greatest Hits", 2005, Bop Tart Records), Michael Gira's Angels of Light, Alice Texas (Peter is credited as guitarist in all published releases), and Jim Sclavunos's The Vanity Set (Peter is credited on all releases from the band's second album, Little Stabs of Happiness, to the latest EP single, "Sheep May Safely Graze").

A self-produced EP entitled Never Sates Nor Palls was released in late 2004. It includes early versions of the songs "The Diva", "There Is No Oblivion", and "Every Angel Is a Terror". The CD-only EP was re-released by New York's Dogprint Records in a limited edition pressing (666 hand-numbered copies), which featured a gatefold-sleeve color reproduction of a painting by Polish-born artist Angelika Miodek.

The band's second EP entitled The Big Cats Will Throw Themselves Over, released on Hungry Eye Records, was recorded alongside producer Jim Sclavunos who had produced for Sonic Youth, The Cramps, 8-Eyed Spy, and Teenage Jesus and the Jerks. Sclavunos also produced gypsy punks Gogol Bordello and London-based garage rock revivalists The Horrors. The EP featured newly recorded versions of "The Diva", "There Is No Oblivion", and "Every Angel Is a Terror", with additional tracks "Push! Push!", "L'Condition Humaine", and "Pictures".

After a brief European tour during November and December 2006, the band returned to the studio with Jim Sclavunos in early 2007 to record their first full-length LP (which has not yet been scheduled for release, as of June 2008).

References

Musical groups from New York (state)